Miloslava  Vostrá (born 26 May 1965 in Kladno, Czechoslovakia) is Czech politician, from 2002 to 2021 she was a member of Chamber of Deputies of the Parliament of the Czech Republic. She is in KSČM (Communist Party of Bohemia and Moravia) and was from 2009 to 2016 deputy chairman of KSČM.

References

External links
Ing. Miloslava Vostrá - Parliament of the Czech Republic 

1965 births
Living people
Politicians from Kladno
Communist Party of Bohemia and Moravia MPs
21st-century Czech women politicians
Members of the Chamber of Deputies of the Czech Republic (2002–2006)
Members of the Chamber of Deputies of the Czech Republic (2006–2010)
Members of the Chamber of Deputies of the Czech Republic (2010–2013)
Members of the Chamber of Deputies of the Czech Republic (2013–2017)
Members of the Chamber of Deputies of the Czech Republic (2017–2021)
University of Finance and Administration alumni